Gianfranco Plenizio (10 January 1941 – 7 February 2017) was an Italian conductor, composer, pianist and essayist.

Life and career 
Born in Sedegliano, Plenizio studied piano with Enrico De Angelis Valentini and conduction under Franco Ferrara. After his debut as a pianist, he focused on conducting; among others, he conducted the London Symphony Orchestra, the Santa Cecilia Orchestra, the Orquesta Nacional de España, the Orchestre de chambre de Genève and the Czech Philharmonic Orchestra.

Active as a film score composer, Plenizio collaborated with notable directors such as Federico Fellini, Billy Wilder, Mario Monicelli, Pietro Germi, Ermanno Olmi. He also authored essays, mainly focusing on the history of music.

Selected filmography 
 Garter Colt (1968) 
 La gatta in calore (1972)
 The Sensuous Nurse (1975)
 Mark of Zorro (1975)
 Young, Violent, Dangerous (1976)
 Una bella governante di colore (1976)
 Hurricane Rosy (1979)
 Spaghetti House  (1982) 
 And the Ship Sails On (1983) 
 La Storia (1986)
 Django 2 (1987)
 Treasure Island in Outer Space (1987)

References

External links
 
 

1941 births
2017 deaths
People from the Province of Udine
Italian film score composers
Italian male film score composers
Italian conductors (music)
Italian male conductors (music)
Male essayists
Italian essayists
Italian male pianists